Vallvidrera, el Tibidabo i les Planes is a neighborhood in the Sarrià-Sant Gervasi district of Barcelona, Catalonia (Spain). It is formed by three areas: Vallvidrera (that was a former municipality added to Sarrià), Tibidabo and les Planes.

Transport
FGC station Les Planes.

Neighbourhoods of Barcelona
Sarrià-Sant Gervasi